Banyo railway station is located on the Shorncliffe line in the suburb of Banyo in the City of Brisbane, Queensland, Australia.

History
The station was built in 1882 on the Sandgate railway line (now the Shorncliffe line). At that time, it was expected that this station would be the junction for the future North Coast railway line and was named Clapham Junction railway station. However it was later decided that junction would be at Northgate railway station and in 1897 it was renamed Banyo railway station.

2012 truck collision

On 14 September 2012, a loaded semi-trailer was stuck on the level crossing at the station, when a northbound train collided with the vehicle, which caused it to be thrown into a southbound service. 
Rail services on the Shorncliffe railway line were disturbed for the rest of the day while a rail safety regulator investigated the collision.

Services
Banyo station is served by all stops Shorncliffe line services from Shorncliffe to Roma Street, Cannon Hill, Manly and Cleveland

Services by platform

References

External links

Banyo station Queensland Rail
Banyo station Queensland's Railways on the Internet
[ Banyo station] TransLink travel information

Railway stations in Brisbane
Banyo, Queensland